Abdulhaleem Al-Amoudi  (born August 19, 1986) is a Saudi Arabian football player who plays a forward .

References

1986 births
Living people
Saudi Arabian footballers
Ohod Club players
Al-Ansar FC (Medina) players
Al-Nahda Club (Saudi Arabia) players
Al-Raed FC players
Al-Orobah FC players
Place of birth missing (living people)
Al-Kawkab FC players
Saudi First Division League players
Saudi Professional League players
Association football forwards